Metcalfe's Skinny is a healthy snack food business set up in 2009 by Julian Metcalfe and, since September 2016, fully owned by the owner of Kettle Foods, Snyder's-Lance.

History
Metcalfe's Skinny Popcorn was set up in 2009 by Matthew Ziff and Julian Metcalfe, the founder of Itsu and Pret a Manger, as part of an overall Metcalfe's Food company business which also produced a number of grocery and snack items for Itsu.

In June 2015, the larger group was split into separate businesses, with Metcalfe's Skinny becoming a business in its own right and the Itsu Grocery brand becoming a subsidiary of the main Itsu brand.

In January 2016, Kettle Chips bought a 26% stake in the business, with Kettle Chips. owner Snyder's-Lance purchasing the remaining 74% stake in September 2016, leading to Metcalfe leaving the business.

In November 2016, a new pack design was launched and references to Metcalfe and Pret were removed from both the new packaging and the website.

Products
The company offers a number of corn based healthy snack products under the Metcalfe's Skinny brand, which include:

 Popcorn Bags (cinema sweet, sinnamon sweet, maple bacon, sea salt, sweet and salt)
 Rice Cakes (milk chocolate, dark chocolate, yoghurt)
 Popcorn Crisps (sweet chilli, say cheese, original)
 Popcorn Thins (milk chocolate, dark chocolate)
 Corncakes (milk chocolate, dark chocolate)

References

External links
Official Website
Kwiketo Snack Box

Snack food manufacturers of the United Kingdom
British companies established in 2009